The 1993–94 Icelandic Hockey League season was the third season of the Icelandic Hockey League, the top level of ice hockey in Iceland. Three teams participated in the league, and Skautafelag Akureyrar won the championship.

Regular season

Final 
 Skautafélag Akureyrar - Skautafélag Reykjavíkur 2:1 (7:8 n.V., 6:3, 7:2)

External links 
 1993-94 season

Icelandic Hockey League
Icelandic Hockey League seasons
1993–94 in Icelandic ice hockey